Pterostylis cheraphila, commonly known as the floodplain rustyhood is a plant in the orchid family Orchidaceae and is endemic to a small area in Victoria. It has a rosette of leaves near its base and up to seven dark brown to blackish flowers with a dark brown, insect-like labellum. It is only found in the Little Desert area.

Description
Pterostylis cheraphila is a terrestrial,  perennial, deciduous, herb with an underground tuber. Three to five stem leaves are wrapped around the flowering spike. The lateral sepals are wider than the galea, dished and have densely hairy edges. The edges of the labellum are wavy, with short, bristly hairs and there are two longer bristles near the "head" end. Flowering occurs from October to November.

Taxonomy and naming
Pterostylis cheraphila was first formally described in 1993 by David Jones & Mark Clements from a specimen collected near Dimboola and the description was published in Muelleria. The specific epithet (cheraphila) is said to be derived from the Greek words cheras meaning "alluvium", "silt" or "detritus" and philo meaning "loving",  referring to the soil type where this species usually grows. In ancient Greek, philos (φίλος) is the word for "loving".

Distribution and habitat
Floodplain rustyhood is only known from the Little Desert area and near Murtoa where it grows with ephemeral plants in silty soils.

References

cheraphila
Orchids of Victoria (Australia)
Plants described in 1993